Ulrik Johansen (born 12 March 1980) is a Danish professional football player, who is playing for the Danish 1st Division club FC Fredericia.

External links
FC Fredericia profile
Vejle Boldklub profile

Living people
1980 births
Danish men's footballers
Odense Boldklub players
Vejle Boldklub players

Association football midfielders